Takatō may refer to:

Takatō, Nagano, former town in Nagano Prefecture that was merged into the expanded city of Ina in 2006
Takatō Domain, feudal domain with its capital at that town
Takatō Castle, home of the lords of the domain
Siege of Takatō (1545)
Siege of Takatō (1582)

People with the given name
, Japanese statesman during the early Meiji period
, Japanese engineer

People with the surname
, Japanese judoka

See also
Takato Matsuki, a character in the anime series Digimon Tamers

Japanese-language surnames
Japanese masculine given names